Paranerita cuneoplagiatus is a moth of the subfamily Arctiinae. It was described by Rothschild in 1922. It is found in Brazil.

References

Paranerita
Moths described in 1922